"Main Rahoon Ya Na Rahoon" is a 2015 song by Indian recording artist Armaan Malik composed by Amaal Mallik. The accompanying music video has been shot in Goa, India and features Bollywood actors Emraan Hashmi and Esha Gupta with Abhinav Shukla. It was released on YouTube by T-Series on 24 November 2015. The song has been well received crossing over 328 million+ views across YouTube as of 27 August 2022.

Accolades
The song won the award for Best Indie Pop Song at the 2016 Mirchi Music Awards. It was also awarded the Best Music Video at the sixth Global Indian Music Academy Awards.

References

External links 
 Main Rahoon Ya Na Rahoon on IMDb

2015 songs
2015 singles
Hindi songs
Indian songs
Hindi film songs
Songs with music by Amaal Mallik